The Angu or Änga people, also called Kukukuku (pronounced "cookah-cookah") are a small and previously violent and cannibal group speaking a number of related languages and living mainly in the high, mountainous region of south-western Morobe, a province of Papua New Guinea. Even though they are a short people, often less than 5 foot, they were  feared for their violent raids on more peaceful villages living in lower valleys.

Despite the high altitude and cold climate of their homeland, the Änga only wore limited clothing, including grass skirts, with a piece similar to a sporran, and cloaks made from beaten bark, called mals.

An account of some of the first contact between the Angu and westerners is described vividly by J. K. McCarthy in his book Patrol into Yesterday: My New Guinea Years.

Four of the Änga languages are almost extinct, but the largest tribe, the Hamtai, are thriving, with a population of 45,000.

Some Aseki district tribes have become a tourist attraction due to their mummies.  There are three famous mummy sites around Aseki in the Hamtai territory.  The Hamtai people now have a small income from charging scientists, tourists and photographers a fee before entrance to the mummy sites.

First contact with the Toulambi 

A film by Jean-Pierre Dutilleux purports to show first contact between a group of Toulambi, reportedly a part of the Angu People, and white people in December 1993. It has been accused of being staged by anthropologist Pierre Lemonnier, who claims a first-hand relationship with the tribe. Lemonnier, however, was sued for defamation and lost the case.

A first contact between the Toulambi tribe was also reported in The Sydney Morning Herald on 22 October 1993, not long before the meeting with Dutilleux:
Government officials in Papua New Guinea say they have discovered another 'lost tribe' [...] The latest group, dubbed the Toulambi tribe, apparently was discovered in a remote area of thick jungle in the Papua New Guinea Highlands... Two near-naked members of the tribe were 'scared to death' when taken by a hunting party to the nearest government station to taste store food and view white men and aeroplanes for the first time... But some people remain sceptical. They believe the group may belong to known isolated border tribes but have been left off the latest census.

References

External links
A New Venture into the Unknown, booklet produced by the Melanesian Mission on their proposed mission to the Kukukuku people of New Guinea, 1935.
"Kukukuku, the Angu people, Papua New Guinea" by Carolyn Leigh, Art-Pacific, August 19, 2002. Retrieved December 28, 2005
"The Smoked Corpses of Aseki" by Ian Lloyd Neubauer "BBC - Travel", December 3, 2015. Retrieved October 1, 2016 

Ethnic groups in Papua New Guinea
Hunter-gatherers of Oceania
Tribes of Oceania